Svetozar Vujović (3 March 1940 – 16 January 1993) was Bosnian and Yugoslav football player and manager, who spent most of his life in Bosnian capital Sarajevo, and entire playing, managerial and administrative career with FK Sarajevo. He is the third most capped player in the club's history with 299 official games. After his playing career he went on to manage the team for two years, before taking a position of a long-standing club director, until his death in besieged city in 1993.

Playing career

Club
He began playing in 1957 in FK Radnik from the town of Hadžići near Sarajevo, and in 1959 he became a member of the FK Sarajevo. Miroslav Brozović, his coach at the time, put him in the position of right back, and he developed into an excellent football player. Later, he successfully played as center half.

In the FK Sarajevo jersey he played a total of 444 games, 299 official with 254 in the league, he also scored eight goals along the way. With 299 played official games he is third most capped player in FK Sarajevo history, behind Ibrahim Biogradlić with 378 and Ihtijarević with 314. Overall number of games (444) place him second on the list of club records, after Biogradlić with 646 games. In his first season with FK Sarajevo 1966/67 he won the title of Yugoslavia champion.

Pathologically afraid of flying, he stopped playing in 1971, officially saying goodbye to the pitch in summer 1972, together with other club player Boško Antić (276 matches and 140 goals) in a match against Sporting Lisbon.

International
With two games for the young team (1962–1963), he capped eight games for the best selection of Yugoslavia. Debuted in meeting of the Olympic teams against Romania (1:2) in Bucharest on 27 September 1963, and the last game for the national team he played in the Olympic tournament in Japan in Osaka on 22 October 1964, again, against Romania (0:3).

Career as club official
In FK Sarajevo, he began to work as a coach in 1973, and 1975 he was appointed director of the club. In the role of director and later as president Vujović spent twenty years and made great contribution to success and stability of FK Sarajevo.

Memorial "Svetozar Vujović Salon"
Following Svetozar's death in 1993, his club FK Sarajevo named main ceremonial lounge room in their administrative facility, located in downtown Sarajevo, into "Svetozar Vujović Salon" in his honor.

References

External links

 FK Sarajevo - official website (in English) 
 FK Sarajevo Info - unofficial website
 Profile at Serbian federation official site
 
 

1940 births
1993 deaths
People from Bileća
Footballers from Sarajevo
Serbs of Bosnia and Herzegovina
Association football defenders
Yugoslav footballers
Yugoslavia international footballers
Olympic footballers of Yugoslavia
Footballers at the 1964 Summer Olympics
FK Sarajevo players
Yugoslav First League players
Yugoslav football managers
FK Sarajevo managers